

Incumbents
Monarch - Philip IV

Events
January 17 - Catalan Revolt: Proclamation of the Catalan Republic
January 26 - Catalan Revolt: Battle of Montjuïc (1641)
March 27 - Portuguese Restoration War: beginning of the Siege of São Filipe near Angra do Heroismo in Azores
July 4–6 - Naval Battle of Tarragona (July 1641)
August 20–25 - Battle of Tarragona (August 1641)
Andalusian independentist conspiracy (1641)
November 4 - Franco-Spanish War (1635-1659): beginning of the Siege of Perpignan (1642)

Births

Deaths
November 9 - Cardinal-Infante Ferdinand of Austria, younger brother of Philip IV (b. 1609 or 1610)

References

 
1640s in Spain